The 2014–15 Biathlon World Cup – World Cup 1 was the opening event of the season and was held in Östersund, Sweden, from 30 November until 7 December 2014.

Schedule of events

Medal winners

Men

Women

Mixed

Achievements 

 Best performance for all time

 , 2nd place in Individual
 , 10th place in Individual
 , 28th place in Individual
 , 37th place in Individual
 , 55th place in Individual
 , 65th place in Individual
 , 66th place in Individual
 , 97th place in Individual and 93rd in Sprint
 , 18th place in Sprint
 , 47th place in Sprint
 , 48th place in Sprint
 , 74th place in Sprint
 , 75th place in Sprint
 , 83rd place in Sprint
 , 85th place in Sprint
 , 21st place in Pursuit
 , 49th place in Pursuit
 , 9th place in Individual
 , 11th place in Individual
 , 12th place in Individual
 , 18th place in Individual
 , 20th place in Individual and 18th in Pursuit
 , 31st place in Individual and 29th in Pursuit
 , 37th place in Individual and 26th in Sprint
 , 49th place in Individual
 , 58th place in Individual
 , 70th place in Individual and 19th in Sprint
 , 1st place in Sprint
 , 10th place in Sprint
 , 11th place in Sprint and 8th in Pursuit
 , 13th place in Sprint
 , 17th place in Sprint and Pursuit
 , 49th place in Sprint and 33rd in Pursuit
 , 50th place in Sprint
 , 27th place in Pursuit
 , 38th place in Pursuit

 First World Cup race

 , 19th place in Individual
 , 26th place in Individual
 , 32nd place in Individual
 , 88th place in Individual
 , 90th place in Individual
 , 95th place in Individual
 , 55th place in Sprint
 , 97th place in Sprint
 , 13th place in Individual
 , 24th place in Individual
 , 51st place in Individual
 , 56th place in Individual
 , 59th place in Individual
 , 74th place in Individual
 , 82nd place in Individual
 , 84th place in Individual
 , 30th place in Sprint
 , 38th place in Sprint
 , 53rd place in Sprint

References 

2014 in Swedish sport
1
November 2014 sports events in Europe
December 2014 sports events in Europe
Sports competitions in Östersund
World Cup - World Cup 1,2014-15